Psylloglyphus is a genus of mites in the family Acaridae.

Species
 Psylloglyphus australiensis Fain, Bartholomaeus, Cooke & Beaucournu, 1990
 Psylloglyphus chiliensis Fain & Beaucournu, 1989
 Psylloglyphus crenulatus Fain & Beaucournu, 1984
 Psylloglyphus foveolatus Fain & Mason, 1989
 Psylloglyphus hemimerus Fain & Beaucournu, 1976
 Psylloglyphus micronychus Fain & Beaucournu, 1986
 Psylloglyphus parapsyllus Fain & Galloway, 1993
 Psylloglyphus uilenbergi Fain, 1966

References

Acaridae